In Newsweekly, known as IN Newsweekly  or in newsweekly during some of its publication, was an LGBT newspaper based in Boston, Massachusetts.  It began in 1991 as IN Boston and became IN Newsweekly in 1993 when it merged with other publications  and increased its coverage to include other New England states. In 2007, publisher and co-founder Chris Robinson sold the paper to HX Media, a New York-based company that published both the New York Blade and HX Magazine.  After changing its title to New England Blade, the paper ceased publication in November 2008.

References

External links
InNewsWeekly Publication Collection Finding Aid

1991 establishments in Massachusetts
Publications established in 1991
Newspapers published in Boston
Publications disestablished in 2008
Defunct newspapers published in Massachusetts